Jinlin District is one of four districts of the prefecture-level city of Yichun, Heilongjiang, China. It was established by merging the former Jinshantun District and Xilin District approved by Chinese State Council in 2019. Its administrative centre is at Fendou Subdistrict.

Administrative divisions 
Jinlin District is divided into 2 towns. 
2 towns
 Xilin, Jinshantun

References

Yichun